The Tuva constituency (No.32) is a Russian legislative constituency covering the entirety of Tuva.

Members elected

Election results

1993

|-
! colspan=2 style="background-color:#E9E9E9;text-align:left;vertical-align:top;" |Candidate
! style="background-color:#E9E9E9;text-align:left;vertical-align:top;" |Party
! style="background-color:#E9E9E9;text-align:right;" |Votes
! style="background-color:#E9E9E9;text-align:right;" |%
|-
|style="background-color:"|
|align=left|Kara-Kys Arakchaa
|align=left|Independent
|
|28.37%
|-
|style="background-color:"|
|align=left|Anatoly Damba-Khuurak
|align=left|Independent
| -
|22.59%
|-
| colspan="5" style="background-color:#E9E9E9;"|
|- style="font-weight:bold"
| colspan="3" style="text-align:left;" | Total
| 
| 100%
|-
| colspan="5" style="background-color:#E9E9E9;"|
|- style="font-weight:bold"
| colspan="4" |Source:
|
|}

1995

|-
! colspan=2 style="background-color:#E9E9E9;text-align:left;vertical-align:top;" |Candidate
! style="background-color:#E9E9E9;text-align:left;vertical-align:top;" |Party
! style="background-color:#E9E9E9;text-align:right;" |Votes
! style="background-color:#E9E9E9;text-align:right;" |%
|-
|style="background-color:"|
|align=left|Galina Salchak
|align=left|Our Home – Russia
|
|40.95%
|-
|style="background-color:#DA2021"|
|align=left|Kara-Kys Arakchaa (incumbent)
|align=left|Ivan Rybkin Bloc
|
|23.14%
|-
|style="background-color:"|
|align=left|Aleksandr Kashin
|align=left|Liberal Democratic Party
|
|6.60%
|-
|style="background-color:"|
|align=left|Anatoly Seren
|align=left|Communist Party
|
|5.96%
|-
|style="background-color:#3A46CE"|
|align=left|Tatyana Nikolaeva
|align=left|Democratic Choice of Russia – United Democrats
|
|4.63%
|-
|style="background-color:"|
|align=left|Vladimir Serikov
|align=left|Independent
|
|3.36%
|-
|style="background-color:"|
|align=left|Sonchukchu Mongush
|align=left|Agrarian Party
|
|2.44%
|-
|style="background-color:"|
|align=left|Altai Piche-ool
|align=left|Independent
|
|2.18%
|-
|style="background-color:"|
|align=left|Amur Khoyugban
|align=left|Independent
|
|1.40%
|-
|style="background-color:#FE4801"|
|align=left|Vyacheslav Salchak
|align=left|Pamfilova–Gurov–Lysenko
|
|1.32%
|-
|style="background-color:#000000"|
|colspan=2 |against all
|
|3.23%
|-
| colspan="5" style="background-color:#E9E9E9;"|
|- style="font-weight:bold"
| colspan="3" style="text-align:left;" | Total
| 
| 100%
|-
| colspan="5" style="background-color:#E9E9E9;"|
|- style="font-weight:bold"
| colspan="4" |Source:
|
|}

1999

|-
! colspan=2 style="background-color:#E9E9E9;text-align:left;vertical-align:top;" |Candidate
! style="background-color:#E9E9E9;text-align:left;vertical-align:top;" |Party
! style="background-color:#E9E9E9;text-align:right;" |Votes
! style="background-color:#E9E9E9;text-align:right;" |%
|-
|style="background-color:"|
|align=left|Nikolay Loktionov
|align=left|Unity
|
|50.06%
|-
|style="background-color:#3B9EDF"|
|align=left|Galina Salchak (incumbent)
|align=left|Fatherland – All Russia
|
|38.81%
|-
|style="background-color:"|
|align=left|Ostap Damba-Khuurak
|align=left|Liberal Democratic Party
|
|2.44%
|-
|style="background-color:"|
|align=left|Sergey Konviz
|align=left|Independent
|
|1.77%
|-
|style="background-color:"|
|align=left|Natalia Tovuu
|align=left|Independent
|
|0.93%
|-
|style="background-color:#000000"|
|colspan=2 |against all
|
|3.29%
|-
| colspan="5" style="background-color:#E9E9E9;"|
|- style="font-weight:bold"
| colspan="3" style="text-align:left;" | Total
| 
| 100%
|-
| colspan="5" style="background-color:#E9E9E9;"|
|- style="font-weight:bold"
| colspan="4" |Source:
|
|}

2001

|-
! colspan=2 style="background-color:#E9E9E9;text-align:left;vertical-align:top;" |Candidate
! style="background-color:#E9E9E9;text-align:left;vertical-align:top;" |Party
! style="background-color:#E9E9E9;text-align:right;" |Votes
! style="background-color:#E9E9E9;text-align:right;" |%
|-
|style="background-color:"|
|align=left|Chylgychy Ondar
|align=left|Independent
|
|39.46%
|-
|style="background-color:"|
|align=left|Sergey Mongush
|align=left|Independent
|
|36.36%
|-
|style="background-color:"|
|align=left|Viktor Norbu
|align=left|Independent
|
|12.99%
|-
|style="background-color:"|
|align=left|Aleksandr Kashin
|align=left|Independent
|
|3.63%
|-
|style="background-color:"|
|align=left|Vladimir Tavberidze
|align=left|Independent
|
|1.12%
|-
|style="background-color:#000000"|
|colspan=2 |against all
|
|3.30%
|-
| colspan="5" style="background-color:#E9E9E9;"|
|- style="font-weight:bold"
| colspan="3" style="text-align:left;" | Total
| 
| 100%
|-
| colspan="5" style="background-color:#E9E9E9;"|
|- style="font-weight:bold"
| colspan="4" |Source:
|
|}

2003

|-
! colspan=2 style="background-color:#E9E9E9;text-align:left;vertical-align:top;" |Candidate
! style="background-color:#E9E9E9;text-align:left;vertical-align:top;" |Party
! style="background-color:#E9E9E9;text-align:right;" |Votes
! style="background-color:#E9E9E9;text-align:right;" |%
|-
|style="background-color:"|
|align=left|Chylgychy Ondar (incumbent)
|align=left|Independent
|
|61.24%
|-
|style="background-color:"|
|align=left|Ivan Chuchev
|align=left|Communist Party
|
|25.62%
|-
|style="background-color:"|
|align=left|Vyacheslav Ushkalov
|align=left|Social Democratic Party
|
|3.55%
|-
|style="background-color:#7C73CC"|
|align=left|Eker-ool Manchyn
|align=left|Great Russia–Eurasian Union
|
|2.56%
|-
|style="background-color:"|
|align=left|Ostap Damba-Khuurak
|align=left|Liberal Democratic Party
|
|1.31%
|-
|style="background-color:#000000"|
|colspan=2 |against all
|
|3.81%
|-
| colspan="5" style="background-color:#E9E9E9;"|
|- style="font-weight:bold"
| colspan="3" style="text-align:left;" | Total
| 
| 100%
|-
| colspan="5" style="background-color:#E9E9E9;"|
|- style="font-weight:bold"
| colspan="4" |Source:
|
|}

2016

|-
! colspan=2 style="background-color:#E9E9E9;text-align:left;vertical-align:top;" |Candidate
! style="background-color:#E9E9E9;text-align:leftt;vertical-align:top;" |Party
! style="background-color:#E9E9E9;text-align:right;" |Votes
! style="background-color:#E9E9E9;text-align:right;" |%
|-
|style="background-color:"|
|align=left|Mergen Oorzhak
|align=left|United Russia
|
|77.39%
|-
|style="background-color:"|
|align=left|Mergen Anai-Ool
|align=left|Communist Party
|
|6.36%
|-
|style="background-color:"|
|align=left|Igor Frent
|align=left|Liberal Democratic Party
|
|4.07%
|-
|style="background:"| 
|align=left|Vladimir Seren-Khuurak
|align=left|A Just Russia
|
|3.26%
|-
|style="background:"| 
|align=left|Valery Salchak
|align=left|Yabloko
|
|2.98%
|-
|style="background:"| 
|align=left|Mongun-ool Mongush
|align=left|People's Freedom Party
|
|2.22%
|-
|style="background-color: " |
|align=left|Aibek Maady
|align=left|Communists of Russia
|
|1.86%
|-
| colspan="5" style="background-color:#E9E9E9;"|
|- style="font-weight:bold"
| colspan="3" style="text-align:left;" | Total
| 
| 100%
|-
| colspan="5" style="background-color:#E9E9E9;"|
|- style="font-weight:bold"
| colspan="4" |Source:
|
|}

2021

|-
! colspan=2 style="background-color:#E9E9E9;text-align:left;vertical-align:top;" |Candidate
! style="background-color:#E9E9E9;text-align:left;vertical-align:top;" |Party
! style="background-color:#E9E9E9;text-align:right;" |Votes
! style="background-color:#E9E9E9;text-align:right;" |%
|-
|style="background-color:"|
|align=left|Aidyn Saryglar
|align=left|United Russia
|
|74.43%
|-
|style="background-color: " |
|align=left|Renat Oorzhak
|align=left|A Just Russia — For Truth
|
|8.98%
|-
|style="background-color:"|
|align=left|Roman Tamoev
|align=left|Communist Party
|
|4.21%
|-
|style="background:"| 
|align=left|Ayas Chudaan-ool
|align=left|Rodina
|
|4.04%
|-
|style="background-color:"|
|align=left|Eres Kara-Sal
|align=left|Liberal Democratic Party
|
|3.20%
|-
|style="background-color: "|
|align=left|Mikhail Sanchai
|align=left|Party of Pensioners
|
|1.82%
|-
|style="background-color:"|
|align=left|Ayan Soyan
|align=left|The Greens
|
|1.20%
|-
| colspan="5" style="background-color:#E9E9E9;"|
|- style="font-weight:bold"
| colspan="3" style="text-align:left;" | Total
| 
| 100%
|-
| colspan="5" style="background-color:#E9E9E9;"|
|- style="font-weight:bold"
| colspan="4" |Source:
|
|}

Notes

References

Russian legislative constituencies
Politics of Tuva